Aldrich Mansion is a late 19th-century property owned by the Roman Catholic Diocese of Providence since 1939.  It is located by the scenic Narragansett Bay at 836 Warwick Neck Avenue in Warwick, Rhode Island, south of Providence, Rhode Island. Originally called Indian Oaks, and once the Senator Nelson W. Aldrich Estate.  The extensive estate was developed in 1899 by Nelson W. Aldrich (1841–1915), a Republican Party politician who dominated state politics of the period.  The main estate house is a sprawling stone French Renaissance structure with lavish interior decoration.  The estate's surviving outbuildings include a boathouse and a caretaker's house, the latter located across Warwick Neck Avenue from the main estate.  Aldrich's heirs sold the property to the Roman Catholic church in 1939, and it was adapted for use as a seminary.  It now serves as the main campus of the Overbrook Academy, a Catholic girls' school. The property now known as "The Aldrich Mansion" still belongs to the Diocese of Providence, and is now available as a site for weddings, formal occasions, business conferences, etc. It is also occasionally used for film and television productions.

The estate was listed on the National Register of Historic Places in 1983.

Brief history 
The estate was originally built and owned by Senator Nelson W. Aldrich of Rhode Island and consisted of over 225 acres. The construction of the estate began in 1896 and was completed some 16 years later. In 1901, his daughter, Abby Aldrich, married John D. Rockefeller, Jr. at the mansion. In 1939, the Senator's heirs transferred the Aldrich Mansion and 100 acres to the Roman Catholic Diocese of Providence for approximately $75,000. From 1946 to 1983, Our Lady of Providence Seminary was housed at the Aldrich Mansion. In 1955, a 100,000+ sq. ft. school was built to house the Seminary. When the seminary relocated, Bishop Hendricken High School used the property as its "Senior Campus" for a decade.

The estate is currently set on 72 acres. It consists of the French-inspired mansion, a gatehouse, 10,000 sq. ft. stables, a 7,500 sq. ft. boathouse, a 15,000 sq. ft. seminary chapel, as well as the seminary's classrooms, dormitories, gymnasium, and dining facilities. The seminary was relocated to Providence some years ago. The facilities were also leased to the Overbrook Academy, a Catholic boarding school for girls, for almost 20 years.

It was William Parrish's mansion in the 1998 motion picture Meet Joe Black.

Usage today 
Still owned by the Roman Catholic Diocese of Providence, the Aldrich Mansion is currently used for wedding receptions, conferences, fund raisers, as well as occasional television and film production work.

See also
Nelson W. Aldrich House, his primary residence in Providence
National Register of Historic Places listings in Kent County, Rhode Island

References

External links 

 
Overbrook Academy web site

Houses completed in 1912
Houses in Warwick, Rhode Island
1912 establishments in Rhode Island
Properties of religious function on the National Register of Historic Places in Rhode Island
Schools in Rhode Island
National Register of Historic Places in Kent County, Rhode Island